Herman K. Beebe was a Louisiana financier who was convicted of fraud in 1988 during the savings and loan crisis.

References

People from Shreveport, Louisiana
American bankers
Living people
American people convicted of fraud
Year of birth missing (living people)